The Gunindiri are an indigenous Australian people of the Northern Territory.

Language
Gunindiri is classified as one of the Garawan languages.

Country
According to Norman Tindale, the Gunindiri had some 5,500 sq. miles of territory on the Barkly Tableland, along the headwaters of the Calvert, Robinson and Nicholson rivers. Their southwestern extension was at Anthony Lagoon. Cresswell Downs was on Gunindiri land as was Fish Waterhole.

Alternative names
 Goonanderry.
 Leecundundeerie.
 Cundundeerie.
 Kunandra.

Notes

Citations

Sources

Aboriginal peoples of the Northern Territory